Elizabeth Claire Kemper (born May 2, 1980), professionally known as Ellie Kemper, is an American actress and comedian. She has been nominated for a Critics' Choice Movie Award, two Critics' Choice Television Awards, two Primetime Emmy Awards, three Satellite Awards, and seven Screen Actors Guild Awards.

She is best known for her roles of Erin Hannon in the sitcom The Office (2009–2013); and Kimmy Schmidt in the sitcom Unbreakable Kimmy Schmidt (2015–2019), which earned her two consecutive nominations for the Primetime Emmy Award for Outstanding Lead Actress in a Comedy Series. She has also appeared in films, notably Bridesmaids (2011), 21 Jump Street (2012), Sex Tape (2014), and most recently in Home Sweet Home Alone (2021). In 2018, she released her debut book, My Squirrel Days.

Early life
Kemper was born in Kansas City, Missouri, the second of four children of Dorothy Ann "Dotty" (née Jannarone) and David Woods Kemper, a son of one of the wealthiest families in Missouri. Her father is the executive chairman of Commerce Bancshares, a bank holding company founded by the Kemper family. She is the granddaughter of Mildred Lane Kemper, namesake of the Mildred Lane Kemper Art Museum at Washington University in St. Louis and the great-great-granddaughter of banker William Thornton Kemper Sr.

She is the elder sister of television writer Carrie Kemper. Kemper is of Italian (from her maternal grandfather), English, French, and German ancestry. She was raised and remains a practicing Roman Catholic.

In 1999, at age 19, she was presented as a debutante at the Veiled Prophet Ball, and was named the Veiled Prophet's Queen of Love and Beauty. Her participation sparked controversy in 2021 due to the Ball's background, which was described as "racist and elitist". The backlash prompted Kemper to release a statement denouncing white supremacy and apologizing for participating in the event, saying that although she had been unaware of the event's "unquestionably racist, sexist, and elitist past", she had been old enough to educate herself.

Education

Kemper's family moved to St. Louis when she was five. She attended Conway Elementary School in the affluent suburb of Ladue and high school at John Burroughs School, where she developed an interest in theater and improvisational comedy. One of her teachers was actor Jon Hamm, with whom she appeared in a school play.

Kemper graduated from Princeton University in 2002 with a Bachelor of Arts in English. At Princeton, she was a member of the improv comedy troupe Quipfire, which was known for its elaborate pranks. She was also a member of the Ivy Club. As part of her undergraduate degree, she completed an 82-page senior thesis, "Isn't It Ironic?", under the supervision of Susan Wolfson, with contribution from Ulrich C. Knoepflmacher.

As a sophomore, she played on Princeton's 1998 national championship field hockey team, maintaining she sat on the bench "roughly 97 percent" of the time, before moving on the following year to focus on theatre. She attended Worcester College, Oxford, for a year, where she studied towards a master's degree in English literature.

Career

Early comedic career

Kemper continued her interest in improvisational comedy at Princeton. She participated in Quipfire!, Princeton's oldest improv comedy group, and the Princeton Triangle Club, a touring musical comedy theater troupe. She also appeared in a radio spot for Dunkin' Donuts.

Kemper earned her Screen Actors Guild card doing commercial advertising of a one-week sale of tents at Kmart. It featured her camping with an onscreen husband, and a shot where a tarantula crawled across her face. She regularly appeared in comedy sketches on Late Night with Conan O'Brien in the late 2000s, and made guest appearances on Important Things with Demetri Martin, and E! Television's The Gastineau Girls, which has been described as her "breakout role". Though the series was reality TV, her role was scripted. She has appeared on Fuse TV's The P.A. In October 2008, she appeared on The Colbert Report in a PSA for Teen Voter Abstinence. She has written several sketch comedy shows, many with her comedy partner Scott Eckert, a fellow Princeton grad. She is a contributing writer for the national satirical newspaper The Onion, and for McSweeney's. She is also a contributor to HuffPost.

Upon moving to New York City, Kemper participated in the People's Improv Theatre and the city troupe of Upright Citizens Brigade, an improvisational comedy and sketch comedy theater. She has appeared in several shows for the Brigade, including Death and/or Despair, Listen Kid, Gang Bang and The Improvised Mystery. At the UCB, she performed with the house improv teams Mailer Daemon and fwand. At the People's Improv Theatre she performs with the house improv team Big Black Car. In August 2008, she auditioned for a spot on the NBC sketch comedy show Saturday Night Live, but was not cast. In July 2009, Kemper was named one of Variety magazine's "10 Comics To Watch".

In 2007, she appeared in How to Kick People, a performance combining comedy and literary performances. In March 2008, she wrote and performed in the one-woman show "Dumb Girls" through the Upright Citizens Brigade Theatre. She also performed in the one-woman show "Feeling Sad/Mad with Ellie Kemper" and has appeared in comedy sketches on Funny or Die, the comedy website started by Will Ferrell and Adam McKay's production company, Gary Sanchez Productions.

Kemper gained Internet interest in August 2007 for her part in "Blowjob Girl", a humor video on the sketch comedy site Derrick Comedy. Kemper said of the video in an April 2010 interview with The A.V. Club: "I really don't like that video, and I wish that I hadn't done it, even though I know that it's a joke. I hate that it got sort of big, because I don't think that it's that funny and I don't want that to be the epitome of my work. It's just one video in a sea of many, but it has made me conscious of not wanting to do a video like that again." Kemper has also contributed an article to CollegeHumor entitled "Regarding Our Decision Never to See Me Again". She also had a minor role in the 2009 film Mystery Team. Kemper starred in a fake iPhone commercial on Late Night with Conan O'Brien in January 2007, six months before the first iPhone was released. Kemper appeared in the Sofia Coppola comedy-drama Somewhere in 2010. She appeared in Bridesmaids in 2011. On April 3, 2013, it was announced that Kemper would be voicing a character in an episode of the animated sitcom American Dad!

Kemper auditioned for a role in Parks and Recreation, an NBC comedy series started in 2009 by Michael Schur and Greg Daniels, creator of the series The Office. She was not cast in the role, but received a call back to audition for a supporting role in The Office as Erin Hannon, a secretary filling in for the regular secretary Pam Beesly when she briefly left the job at the end of the fifth season. Kemper was cast in the role, and started appearing in the show in April 2009. The character was originally written to be more sarcastic and dry, but the writers changed her to be more perky and optimistic to more closely resemble Kemper herself. Kemper described the character as "an exaggerated version of myself". Kemper described herself as a "huge fan" of the show and was thrilled to be on it. Although the character was originally intended for four episodes, the producers were impressed with Kemper and signed her as a regular in the sixth season. Jennifer Celotta, a screenwriter with the series, described Kemper as a "fun addition" to the show.

Television work

Kemper received positive reviews for her role in The Office. Alan Sepinwall, television columnist with The Star-Ledger, praised the "infectious joy and sweetness" she brought to the show. Joshua Ostroff of Eye Weekly described Erin as one of the best new television characters of the 2008–2009 season and said, "Erin's high-grade adorability, up-for-anything attitude and sheer niceness is unlike anyone else in the office, adding a welcome new wrinkle for next season." Andy Shaw of TV Fodder said she "adds some freshness to the cast" and Josh McAuliffe of The Times-Tribune in Scranton, Pennsylvania, said he liked Erin's "cheerful, appealingly goofy personality". Many critics have singled her out as a highlight of the show's eighth season following Steve Carell's departure. In October 2009, Kemper appeared in Subtle Sexuality, a set of three The Office webisodes about efforts by Erin and Kelly Kapoor (Mindy Kaling) to start a girl group.

Following The Office, she starred in the Netflix original comedy series Unbreakable Kimmy Schmidt as the fish-out-of-water title character. She plays a former abductee and forced cult member who wants to shed the victim pity of her small hometown and moves to New York. Her performance on the show has been widely acclaimed, and she received multiple nominations for the Screen Actors Guild Award and Primetime Emmy Award for Outstanding Lead Actress in a Comedy Series.

In summer 2015, Kemper served as a temporary co-host of Today alongside Al Roker, Natalie Morales, Tamron Hall, and Willie Geist.

In 2019, she appeared as a guest judge on season 14 of America's Got Talent.

Other work
In 2018, Kemper recorded for the audiobook A Day in the Life of Marlon Bundo. She also recorded the audiobook for 2019's The Legends of Greemulax, a novel attributed to her character Kimmy Schmidt.

In 2018, she also published her first book, My Squirrel Days.

Personal life
In 2012, Kemper became engaged to comedy writer Michael Koman. They married on July 7, 2012. They have two sons, born in August 2016 and September 2019. On The Late Show with Stephen Colbert, Kemper said that her Jewish husband had agreed to raise their children Roman Catholic.

Filmography

Film

Television

Bibliography

Awards and nominations

References

External links

 

1980 births
Living people
21st-century American actresses
21st-century American comedians
Actresses from Kansas City, Missouri
Actresses from St. Louis
American people of Breton descent
American people of English descent
American people of French descent
American people of German descent
American people of Italian descent
Alumni of Worcester College, Oxford
American comedy writers
American debutantes
American female field hockey players
American film actresses
American television actresses
American voice actresses
American women comedians
Catholics from Missouri
Catholics from New York (state)
Ellie
The Onion people
Princeton Tigers field hockey players
Upright Citizens Brigade Theater performers